Mary Cadogan (née Summersby) (30 May 1928 – 29 September 2014) was an English author. She wrote extensively on popular and children's fiction including biographies of the creators of William Brown (Just William) and Billy Bunter.

Biography
Mary Summersby was born in Brentford. 

She started working for the BBC before the Second World War and met many of the popular entertainers of the time, and later worked on Schools Programming. In 1958 she started working for the Indian philosopher Krishnamurti and remained for nearly twenty years.

Mary Cadogan's writing career started late but her first book You're a Brick, Angela! was an immediate success. Her articles on the history of children's fiction have appeared in a number of magazines. She wrote a notable biography of Richmal Crompton, who wrote the Just William books. She first met her in the late 1940s, but reported that she was then too shy to ask any questions about her writings.

She was editor of the Just William Society magazine for many years and also edited the Story Paper Collectors' Digest between 1987 and 2005. She was also a member of The London Old Boys' Book Club.

Her books, including her collaborations with Patricia Craig, covered a wide spectrum of popular fiction.

She was interviewed for Gyles Brandreth's programme on the centenary of Billy Bunter that was broadcast on BBC Radio 4 in February 2008.

She had a 5 star carrot cake recipe on BBC good food, with over 1500 reviews.

Cadogan died on 29 September 2014.

Awards and honours
 Honorary Doctor of Letters from Lancaster University, 2009

Published books
You're a Brick, Angela! The Girls' Story from 1839-1975 (with Patricia Craig) (1976) (updated and revised edition 1986)  
Women and Children First: The Fiction of Two World Wars (with Patricia Craig) 1978)
Richmal Crompton: The Woman Behind William (1986) 
The Lady Investigates: Women Detectives and Spies in Fiction (with Patricia Craig) (1986) 
Frank Richards: The Chap Behind the Chums (1988) 
Chin Up, Chest Out, Jemima: A Celebration of the Schoolgirls' Story (1989)
The William Companion (1991) 
Women with Wings: Female Flyers in Fact and Fiction (1992)  
And Then Their Hearts Stood Still: An Exuberant Look at Romantic Fiction Past and Present (1994)
Just William Through the Ages (1994) 
Mary Carries on: Reflections on Some Favourite Girls' Stories (2008)

She also wrote the chapter on girls' comics in the DC Thomson Bumper Fun Book (1977)

References

External links
 Interview with Mary Cadogan

1928 births
2014 deaths
English writers
English journalists
English biographers
English children's writers
English women non-fiction writers
British women children's writers
Women biographers